Glatzer is a surname. Notable people with the surname include:

Ben Glatzer (born 1959), Australian sound engineer, producer
Jack Glatzer (born 1939), American violinist
Jonathan Glatzer (born 1969), writer, director, and producer
Nahum Norbert Glatzer (1903–1990), American literary scholar, theologian, and editor

See also
Glatzer Neisse, a river in southwestern Poland